This is a list of episodes for the fifteenth and final season (1964–65) of the television version of The Jack Benny Program. For this season, the show was moved from CBS to NBC.

Episodes

References
 
 

1964 American television seasons
1965 American television seasons
Jack 15